Peter Wilhelm Kreydahl Bøckman Jr. (14 May 1927 – 17 December 2006) was a Norwegian religious studies scholar.

He was born in Skjervøy municipality in Troms, Norway. He was a grandson of bishop Peter W. K. Bøckman, Sr. and brother of journalist Knut Bøckman. He graduated as cand.theol. in 1953, and following studied in the United States and Sweden, he was hired as a lecturer at the University of Oslo in 1967. From 1975 to 1997 he was a professor of religious studies at the University of Trondheim. He published several books on theological topics.

Selected works
Gud og menneske : en kristen troslære (2004) 
Den norske kirke : historisk og aktuelt (1989) 
Liv, fellesskap, tjeneste. En kristen etikk (1970)

References

1927 births
2006 deaths
People from Skjervøy
Religious studies scholars
Academic staff of the Norwegian University of Science and Technology